Dead or Alive 5 Plus (stylized as Dead or Alive 5+ and abbreviated to DOA5+) is a fighting game in the Dead or Alive series, developed by Team Ninja and released by Tecmo Koei for the PlayStation Vita in March 2013. An expanded handheld port of the 2012 game Dead or Alive 5, DOA5+ was met with positive critical reception, gaining better scores than the original.

Gameplay

Dead or Alive 5 Plus  introduces new training options, such as Command Training to practice attacks, Combo Challenge to master combos, and a free training mode enabling players to focus on the particular attacks they want to learn. It also features cross-platform abilities, enabling the users of different PlayStation systems to fight online matches, to share downloadable content (DLC) from the PlayStation Store with the original version, and to swap the save data between the PS3 and Vita.

In addition to the normal control system, Plus features optional touchscreen-based moves in the Touch Play Mode, where the fights are seen via a first-person  perspective view and the players touch, flick, and pinch the screen to attack their opponents. It also offers the game's breast motion physics with four settings: stilled, "Natural", "DOA", and "OMG".

DOA5+ lacks Story Mode Missions and Lobby Matches, as well as an ability to upload the recorded fights to YouTube. Tag Fights are available only in the Story Mode, while Versus, Arcade and Time Attack modes are solo only.

Development and release
Dead or Alive 5 Plus was revealed on December 1, 2012. The demo version of DOA5+ was made available on March 19, 2013, the day of the game's release in North America.

The Collector's Edition of Dead or Alive 5 Plus in Japan includes download codes for 12 bonus "sexy costumes", a Vita cover, Dead or Alive 5 Soundtrack Volume 2, and a code to download the "extreme private gravure movie". The Dead or Alive 5 Cross Play Pack includes copies of the game for both the Vita and PS3, along with "sexy costumes for Kasumi, Ayane and Tina, cheerleader costumes for Kasumi, Ayane and Tina, codes for the "Premium Sexy Costume" and "Paradise Sexy Costume" packs, and a code for the "extreme private gravure movie". The "costume & video set" was also made available as a paid downloadable content in limited time offer during April–May 2013.

Reception

Dead or Alive Plus for the PlayStation Vita received universally strong reviews for its high-quality graphics and control system, as well as its extra features. Several reviewers regarded it as a much better conversion than Team Ninja's own earlier Ninja Gaiden Sigma 2 Plus (released for the Vita in February 2013), in particular for DOA5+'''s consistent frame rate of 60 frames per second (as opposed to only 30 fps in NGS2+). However, some noted that they would recommend the purchase only for those who do not own another version of Dead or Alive 5 already.

IGN's Vince Ingenito wrote that "much like Ultimate Marvel vs. Capcom 3, this is a textbook example of a fighting game port done properly," adding that "for a version that fits neatly inside your pocket, you can't ask for much more than that." Destructoid's Ian Bonds compared it favorably to the Vita port Mortal Kombat, writing that "one of last year's best fighting games on home consoles has become one of this year's best handheld fighters." Steve Hannley of Hardcore Gamer wrote that the Vita version not only "remains the great fighting game it was on consoles and is enhanced here with multiple new and exciting additions" but being "the handheld rendition of a graphically-intense six month old game makes that fact alone worth the price of admission." According to Game Revolution, "Dead or Alive 5+ succeeds with arresting visuals, expansive console-quality modes, unique touchscreen gameplay, and the reliable replayability of a fighter, all in your pocket." Ryan King of NowGamer called it "the perfect game for Vita with a control scheme that works, lovely visuals and a rock solid port behind it," being not only "one of the best-looking games on Vita" but also "definitely one of the most fun." 

See alsoDead or Alive 5 UltimateDead or Alive 5: Last Round''

References

External links

2013 video games
3D fighting games
Crossover fighting games
Dead or Alive (franchise) video games
Multiplayer online games
Video games about ninja
PlayStation Vita-only games
Science fiction video games
Fighting games
Virtua Fighter
PlayStation Vita games
Video games developed in Japan
Video games with cross-platform play